The G5 is a South African towed howitzer of 155 mm calibre developed in South Africa by Denel Land Systems. The G5 design was based on the Canadian GC-45 155mm gun which was highly modified to suit southern African conditions.

Production history
During the Angolan Bush War, the South African Defence Force found itself at a disadvantage when facing opponents equipped with long-range Soviet Katyusha rocket launchers, which outranged South Africa's World War II-era 5.5-inch (140 mm) howitzers by a considerable margin. This led to the issue of a staff requirement for a new artillery system as well as ammunition systems, gun tractor, fire control equipment and a fire control computer system.

From 1963, South Africa had been placed under a United Nations sponsored anti-apartheid arms embargo that led to the creation of the indigenous Armscor military-industrial company to circumvent the arms embargo and to produce weapons systems uniquely tailored to South Africa's needs. Armscor responded to the staff requirement and commenced development in 1976. A number of existing designs were evaluated and examples procured in contravention of the arms embargo. As an interim weapon system to act as a stop-gap during the indigenous production process, a number of Soltam 155mm M-71 gun-howitzers were procured from Israel and entered service as the G4 howitzer.

The Canadian GC-45 was selected as the baseline howitzer from which to commence indigenous development. Armscor procured barrels, 30,000 rounds and design specifications for the GC-45 from Gerald Bull. One of the GC-45 test pieces was mounted on a US 155mm M59 carriage – and a further six GC-45s had changes made to internal ballistics, barrel construction and carriage and cradle fixtures, to become the prototype models eventually leading to the G5. These GC-45s had been developed by SRC International of Belgium, a joint venture between Gerald Bull's Space Research Corporation of Canada and PRB of Belgium. The G5 became operational in 1983.

In 2002 Denel produced the G5-2000 version, with much greater range and accuracy than the earlier 45-calibre version.

The G5 gun has been placed on an OMC 6×6 chassis to produce the fully self-propelled G6 howitzer, and won major export sales in this form from the United Arab Emirates and Oman. In response to a request from India it has also been tested on the back of a TATRA 8×8 wheeled truck, a combination known as the T5-2000. It has also been fitted into a turret, named the T6, that can be placed on any suitable vehicle; it has been fitted on the T-72 tank.

Operational history
The G5 howitzer saw action in Angola and Namibia in the South African Border War between 1986 and 1989, where it was in service with the South African Defence Force. The G5 was used operationally for the first time during Operation Alpha Centauri in 1986. The G5 also saw action in the Iran–Iraq War between 1980 and 1988, where it was used by both Iraq and Iran.

Variants
 G5 Mk I
 G5 Mk II
 G5 Mk III
 G5 Mk IIIA
 G5-2000: 52-calibre gun

Operators

Current operators
 : 30
 : 6 (probably donated by the United Arab Emirates to the Libyan National Army)
 : 28
 : 72 in service.

Former operators

 : 100 G5s were operated, but these have probably all been destroyed or abandoned since the 2003 invasion of Iraq.
 : 12
 : 6 (donated to Libya)

See also
 GC-45 howitzer
 G4 howitzer
 G6 howitzer

References

External links

 Denel G5 brochure
 G5-52 155mm 45-calibre, towed gun howitzer
 G5 is battle ready
 G5 at armyreco.ifrance.com

155 mm artillery
Howitzers
Military equipment introduced in the 1980s
Field artillery of the Cold War
Cold War artillery of South Africa
Denel